Cevdet is a Turkish form of the Arabic name Jawdat and may refer to:

Given name
 Cevdet Bey (1878–1955), (also D'jedvet Bey) governor of the Van vilayet of the Ottoman Empire, convicted war criminal, responsible for massacre of over 55 000 Assyrian Christians
 Cevdet Can (born 1969), Turkish alpine skier
 Cevdet Caner (born 1973), Austrian businessman
 Cevdet Dermenci (1918–1985), Soviet Crimean Tatar battalion commander
 Cevdet Erek (born 1974), Turkish artist and musician
 Cevdet Kerim İncedayı (1893–1951), Turkish army officer, politician and author
 Cevdet Kılıçlar (1972–2010), Turkish journalist and photographer
 Cevdet Sunay (1899–1982), Turkish army officer
 Cevdet Sümer (1922–?), Turkish equestrian
 Cevdet Yılmaz (born 1967), Turkish politician

Middle name
 Ahmet Cevdet Oran (1862–1935), Turkish journalist
 Melih Cevdet Anday (1915–2002), Turkish writer

Surname
 Abdullah Cevdet (1869–1932), Ottoman intellectual and medical doctor
 Ahmed Cevdet Pasha (1822–1895), Ottoman statesman

Fictional characters
Cevdet, main character in Turkish television drama Vatanım Sensin

Turkish-language surnames
Turkish masculine given names